Autosuggestion is a psychological technique related to the placebo effect, developed by apothecary Émile Coué at the beginning of the 20th century. It is a form of self-induced suggestion in which individuals guide their own thoughts, feelings, or behavior. The technique is often used in self-hypnosis.

Typological distinctions
Émile Coué identified two very different types of self-suggestion:
 intentional, "reflective autosuggestion": made by deliberate and conscious effort, and
 unintentional, "spontaneous auto-suggestion": which is a "natural phenomenon of our mental life … which takes place without conscious effort [and has its effect] with an intensity proportional to the keenness of [our] attention".

In relation to Coué's group of "spontaneous auto-suggestions", his student Charles Baudouin (1920, p. 41) made three further useful distinctions, based upon the sources from which they came:
 "Instances belonging to the representative domain   (sensations, mental images, dreams, visions, memories, opinions, and all intellectual phenomena)."
 "Instances belonging to the affective domain   (joy or sorrow, emotions, sentiments, tendencies, passions)."
 "Instances belonging to the active or motor domain   (actions, volitions, desires, gestures, movements at the periphery or in the interior of the body, functional or organic modifications)."

Émile Coué
Émile Coué, who had both B.A. and B.Sc. degrees before he was 21, graduated top of his class (with First Class Honours) with a degree in pharmacology from the prestigious Collège Sainte-Barbe in Paris in 1882. Having spent an additional six months as an intern at the Necker-Enfants Malades Hospital in Paris, he returned to Troyes, where he worked as an apothecary from 1882 to 1910.

"Hypnosis" à la Ambroise-Auguste Liébeault and Hippolyte Bernheim
In 1885, his investigations of hypnotism and the power of the imagination began with Ambroise-Auguste Liébeault and Hippolyte Bernheim, two leading exponents of "hypnosis", of Nancy, with whom he studied in 1885 and 1886 (having taken leave from his business in Troyes). Following this training, "he dabbled with ‘hypnosis’ in Troyes in 1886, but soon discovered that their Liébeault's techniques were hopeless, and abandoned ‘hypnosis’ altogether".

Hypnotism à la James Braid and Xenophon LaMotte Sage
In 1901, Coué sent to the United States for a free book, Hypnotism as It is (i.e., Sage, 1900a), which purported to disclose "secrets [of the] science that brings business and social success" and "the hidden mysteries of personal magnetism, hypnotism, magnetic healing, etc.". Deeply impressed by its contents, he purchased the French language version of the associated correspondence course (i.e., Sage, 1900b, and 1900c), created by  stage hypnotist extraordinaire, "Professor Xenophon LaMotte Sage,  A.M., Ph.D., LL.D., of Rochester, New York" (who had been admitted into the prestigious Medico-Legal Society of New York in 1899).

In real life, Xenophon LaMotte Sage was none other than Ewing Virgil Neal (1868-1949), the multi-millionaire, calligrapher, hypnotist, publisher, advertising/marketing pioneer (he launched the career of Carl R. Byoir), pharmaceutical manufacturer, parfumier, international businessman, confidant of Mussolini, Commandatore of the Order of the Crown of Italy, Officer of the Legion of Honour, and fugitive from justice, who moved to France in the 1920s.

Sage's course supplied the missing piece of the puzzle — namely, Braid-style hypnotic inductions — the solution for which had, up to that time, eluded Coué: 
     "Coué immediately recognised that the course’s Braid-style of hypnotism was ideal for mental therapeutics. He undertook an intense study, and was soon skilled enough to offer hypnotism alongside his pharmaceutical enterprise. In the context of Liébeault’s ‘hypnosis’, Braid’s hypnotism, and Coué’s (later) discoveries about autosuggestion, one must recognise the substantially different orientations of Liébeault’s "suggestive therapeutics", which concentrated on imposing the coercive power of the operator’s suggestion, and Braid’s "psycho-physiology", which concentrated on activating the transformative power of the subject’s mind."

Although he had abandoned Liébeault's "hypnosis" in 1886, he adopted Braid's hypnotism in 1901; and, in fact, in addition to, and (often) separate from, his auto-suggestive practices, Coué actively used Braid's hypnotism for the rest of his professional life.

Suggestion and Auto-suggestion
Coué was so deeply impressed by Bernheim's concept of “suggestive therapeutics” — in effect, "an imperfect re-branding of the ‘dominant idea’ theory that Braid had appropriated from Thomas Brown" — that, on his return to Troyes from his (1886-1886) interlude with Liébeault and Bernheim, he made a practice of reassuring his clients by praising each remedy's efficacy. He noticed that, in specific cases, he could increase a medicine's efficacy by praising its effectiveness. He realized that, when compared with those to whom he said nothing, those to whom he praised the medicine had a noticeable improvement (this is suggestive of what would later be identified as a "placebo response").
     "Around 1903, Coué recommended a new patent medicine, based on its promotional material, which effected an unexpected and immediate cure (Baudouin, 1920, p.90; Shrout, 1985, p.36). Coué (the chemist) found “[by subsequent] chemical analysis in his laboratory [that there was] nothing in the medicine which by the remotest stretch of the imagination accounted for the results” (Shrout, ibid.). Coué (the hypnotist) concluded that it was cure by suggestion; but, rather than Coué having cured him, the man had cured himself by continuously telling himself the same thing that Coué had told him."

The birth of "Conscious Autosuggestion"
Coué discovered that subjects could not be hypnotized against their will and, more importantly, that the effects of hypnotic suggestion waned when the subjects regained consciousness. He thus eventually developed the Coué method, and released his first book, Self-Mastery Through Conscious Autosuggestion (published in 1920 in England and two years later in the United States). He described autosuggestion itself as:

Although Coué never doubted pharmaceutical medicine, and still advocated its application, he also came to believe that one's mental state could positively affect, and even amplify, the pharmaceutical action of medication. He observed that those patients who used his mantra-like conscious suggestion, "Every day, in every way, I'm getting better and better", (French: Tous les jours, à tous points de vue, je vais de mieux en mieux; lit. 'Every day, from all points of view, I'm getting better and better') — in his view, replacing their "thought of illness" with a new "thought of cure", could augment their pharmaceutical regimen in an efficacious way.

Conceptual difference from Autogenic Training
By contrast with the conceptualization driving Coué's auto-suggestive self-administration procedure — namely, that constant repetition creates a situation in which "a particular idea saturates the microcognitive environment of 'the mind'…", which, then, in its turn, "is converted into a corresponding ideomotor, ideosensory, or ideoaffective action, by the ideodynamic principle of action", "which then, in its turn, generates the response" — the primary target of the entirely different self-administration procedure developed by Johannes Heinrich Schultz, known as Autogenic Training, was to affect the autonomic nervous system, rather than (as Coué's did) to affect 'the mind'.

The Coué method

The Coué method centers on a routine repetition of this particular expression according to a specified ritual, in a given physical state, and in the absence of any sort of allied mental imagery, at the beginning and at the end of each day. Coué maintained that curing some of our troubles requires a change in our subconscious/unconscious thought, which can only be achieved by using our imagination. Although stressing that he was not primarily a healer but one who taught others to heal themselves, Coué claimed to have affected organic changes through autosuggestion.

Underlying principles
Coué thus developed a method which relied on the belief that any idea exclusively occupying the mind turns into reality, although only to the extent that the idea is within the realm of possibility. For instance, a person without hands will not be able to make them grow back. However, if a person firmly believes that his or her asthma is disappearing, then this may actually happen, as far as the body is actually able to physically overcome or control the illness. On the other hand, thinking negatively about the illness (e.g. "I am not feeling well") will encourage both mind and body to accept this thought.

Willpower
Coué observed that the main obstacle to autosuggestion was willpower. For the method to work, the patient must refrain from making any independent judgment, meaning that he must not let his will impose its own views on positive ideas. Everything must thus be done to ensure that the positive "autosuggestive" idea is consciously accepted by the patient, otherwise one may end up getting the opposite effect of what is desired.

Coué noted that young children always applied his method perfectly, as they lacked the willpower that remained present among adults. When he instructed a child by saying "clasp your hands" and then "you can't pull them apart" the child would thus immediately follow his instructions and be unable to unclasp their hands.

Self-conflict 
Coué believed a patient's problems were likely to increase if his willpower and imagination opposed each other, something Coué referred to as "self-conflict." As the conflict intensifies, so does the problem i.e., the more the patient consciously wants to sleep, the more he becomes awake. The patient must thus abandon his willpower and instead put more focus on his imaginative power in order to fully succeed with his cure.

Effectiveness
With his method, which Coué called "un truc," patients of all sorts would come to visit him. The list of ailments included kidney problems, diabetes, memory loss, stammering, weakness, atrophy and all sorts of physical and mental illnesses. According to one of his journal entries (1916), he apparently cured a patient of a uterus prolapse as well as "violent pains in the head" (migraine).

Evidence
Advocates of autosuggestion appeal to brief case histories published by Émile Coué describing his use of autohypnosis to cure, for example, enteritis and paralysis from spinal cord injury.

Autogenic training
Autogenic training is an autosuggestion-centered relaxation technique influenced by the Coué method.  In 1932, German psychiatrist Johannes Schultz developed and published on autogenic training. Unlike autosuggestion, autogenic training has been proven in clinical trials and, along with other relaxation techniques, such as progressive relaxation and meditation, has replaced autosuggestion in therapy. The co-author of Schultz's multi-volume tome on autogenic training, Wolfgang Luthe, was a firm believer that autogenic training was a powerful approach that should only be offered to patients by qualified professionals.  Its effectiveness has been confirmed in several studies.

See also

Footnotes

References

 Baudouin, C. (Paul, E & Paul, C. trans.), Suggestion and Autosuggestion: A Psychological and Pedagogical Study Based on the Investigations made by the New Nancy School, George Allen & Unwin, (London), 1920.
 Carpenter, W.B., "On the Influence of Suggestion in Modifying and directing Muscular Movement, independently of Volition", Royal Institution of Great Britain, (Proceedings), 1852, (12 March 1852), pp. 147–153.
 Conroy, M.S. (2014). The Cosmetics Baron You've Never Heard Of: E. Virgil Neal and Tokalon (Third, Revised Edition). Englewood, CO: Altus History LLC. 
 Coué, E. (1912). "De la suggestion et de ses applications" (‘Suggestion and its Applications’), Bulletin de la Société d'Histoire Naturelle et de Palethnologie de la Haute-Marne, 2(1), pp.25-46.
 Coué, E. (1922a). La Maîtrise de soi-même par l'autosuggestion consciente: Autrefois de la suggestion et de ses applications. (‘Mastery of One’s Self through Conscious Autosuggestion: Formerly “Suggestion and its Applications”’) Emile Coué, (Nancy), 1922.
 Coué, E. (1922b). Self Mastery Through Conscious Autosuggestion. New York, NY: American Library Service. (A complete translation, by unknown translator, of Coué (1922a).)
 Coué, E. (1922c). Self Mastery Through Conscious Autosuggestion. New York, NY: Malkan Publishing Company. (A partial translation of Coué (1922a) by Archibald S. Van Orden).
 Coué, E. (1923). My Method: Including American Impressions. Garden City, NY: Doubleday, Page & Company. 
 Coué, E., & Orton, J.L. (1924). Conscious Auto-Suggestion. London: T. Fisher Unwin Limited. 
 Guillemain, H. (2010), La Méthode Coué: Histoire d'une Pratique de Guérison au XXe Siècle (‘The Coué Method: History of a Twentieth Century Healing Practice’). Paris: Seuil.
 Noble, D., Elements of Psychological Medicine: An Introduction to the Practical Study of Insanity Adapted for Students and Junior Practitioners, John Churchill, (London), 1853.
 Noble, D. (1854). Three Lectures on the Correlation of Psychology and Physiology: III. On Ideas, and Their Dynamic Influence, Association Medical Journal, Vol.3, No.81, (21 July 1854), pp.642-646.
 Orton, J.L., Hypnotism Made Practical (Tenth Edition), Thorsons Publishers Limited, (London) 1955.
 Rapp, D. (1987). “Better and Better—”: Couéism as a Psychological Craze of the Twenties in England. Studies in Popular Culture,10(2), 17-36.
 X. LaM. (1900a). Hypnotism as It is: A Book for Everybody (Sixth Edition), New York State Publishing Company, (Rochester), 1900.
 Sage, X. LaM. (1900b). Un Cours Par Correspondance Sur Le Magnétisme Personnel, Hypnotisme, Mesmérisme, Calmánt Magnétique, Thérapeutiques Suggestives, Psycho-Thérapeutique, Etc, Etc. par X. LaMotte Sage, A.M., Ph.D., LL.D. (Edition Revisée), New York Institute of Science, (Rochester), 1900.
 Sage, X. LaM. (1900c). Cours Supérieur Traitant du Magnétisme Personnel, de l’Hypnotisme, de la Thérapeutique Suggestive, et de la Guérison pour le Magnétisme, par X. LaMotte Sage, A.M., Ph.D., LL.D.,  New York Institute of Science, (Rochester), 1900.
 Shrout, R.N., Modern Scientific Hypnosis: From Ancient Mystery to Contemporary Science, (Wellingborough), Thorsons, 1985.
 Westphal, C., & Laxenaire, M. (2012). Émile Coué: Amuseur ou Précurseur? (‘Émile Coué: Entertainer or Forerunner’), Annales Médico-Psychologiques, Revue Psychiatrique, 170(1), pp. 36–38. doi=10.1016/j.amp.2011.12.001
 Yankauer, A., The Therapeutic Mantra of Emile Coué, Perspectives in Biology and Medicine, Vol.42, No.4, (Summer 1999), pp. 489–495. doi=10.1353/pbm.1999.0012
 Yeates, Lindsay B. (2016a), "Émile Coué and his Method (I): The Chemist of Thought and Human Action", Australian Journal of Clinical Hypnotherapy & Hypnosis, Volume 38, No.1, (Autumn 2016), pp. 3–27.
 Yeates, Lindsay B. (2016b), "Émile Coué and his Method (II): Hypnotism, Suggestion, Ego-Strengthening, and Autosuggestion", Australian Journal of Clinical Hypnotherapy & Hypnosis, Volume 38, No.1, (Autumn 2016), pp. 28–54.
 Yeates, Lindsay B. (2016c), "Émile Coué and his Method (III): Every Day in Every Way", Australian Journal of Clinical Hypnotherapy & Hypnosis, Volume 38, No.1, (Autumn 2016), pp. 55–79.

Hypnosis
Positive mental attitude